Acleris forsskaleana, the maple leaftier moth, is a moth of the family Tortricidae. It is found in Europe and North America in woodlands and gardens.

The wingspan is 12–17 mm. The ground colour of the forewings is yellowish underlying a   reticulated darker pattern and a greyish suffusion across the disc. Julius von Kennel provides a full description. 

The moth flies from June to September from dusk onwards.

The main food plants in Europe are field maple (Acer campestre) and sycamore (A. pseudoplatanus); the larvae can also be found on Norway maple (A. platanoides).

The name honours Peter Forsskål.

References

External links 
 
 waarneming.nl .
 Lepidoptera of Belgium
Acleris forsskaleana at UKMoths

forsskaleana
Tortricidae of Europe
Moths of North America
Moths described in 1758
Taxa named by Carl Linnaeus